Bear Island is an island in Lake Temagami of Northeastern Ontario, Canada.

Bear Island is home to the Temagami First Nation and is a portion of the Aboriginal community, the Teme-Augama Anishnabai (the deep water people). It is only a small portion of the Anishnabe's n'Daki Menan (homeland) which includes  of land in the area. Bear Island has had human habitation as early as 1000 BC.

Geology
Bear Island lies at the eastern end of the Temagami Magnetic Anomaly, a buried geological structure that is egg shaped.

Notable people 

 Ignace Tonené, former chief.

See also
List of islands of Lake Temagami

References

Landforms of Temagami
Lake islands of Ontario